Furcifer nicosiai is a large species of chameleon, a lizard in the family Chamaeleonidae. The species is endemic to western Madagascar. Described as new to science in 1999, it was ranked as an endangered species by the International Union for Conservation of Nature (IUCN).

Etymology
The specific name, nicosiai, is in honor of Guido Nicosia, Italian Ambassador to Madagascar (1996–1999).

Description
Furcifer nicosiai is relatively large, and has a high parietal crest (a central ridge down the front of the casque), but lacks appendages on its snout (rostrum). It features canthi rostrales that are separated, a poorly developed gular crest (a row of small spines running down the centre of the throat), a distinctive rostral profile, a complete ventral crest (a row of small conical scales extending down the centre of the belly) and a poorly developed dorsal crest extending from the neck region to the tail. It is similar in appearance to  Furcifer verrucosus, with which it is similarly sexually dimorphic. Furcifer nicosiai can be distinguished from F. verrucosus by its smaller size, different colour patterns, and the orientation of its hemipenis.

Distribution and habitat
Furcifer nicosiai is found in the limestone outcrops in a small area of west Madagascar, in the Melaky Region, north of the Manambolo River. It has only been found in the Tsingy de Bemaraha National Park (Parc National Tsingy de Bemaraha) though there is a possibility that it may also be found further north. The IUCN has ranked Furcifer nicosiai as an Endangered species. Its population is believed to be in decline. The major threat to the species is the fragmentation, loss and degradation of the forest it lives in, which includes damaging human activities like agriculture, logging, and the clearing of land by fire.

Taxonomy
Furcifer nicosiai was initially described by Jesu, Matioli and Schimmenti in 1999. The type specimens were collected in February and March 1997, during the rainy season. Furcifer oustaleti,  Furcifer verrucosus and Furcifer nicosiai group of Chamaeleonidae may well contain other undescribed species and needs a major revision according to the IUCN Red List of Threatened Species.

References

Furcifer
Endangered fauna of Africa
Endemic fauna of Madagascar
Reptiles of Madagascar
Reptiles described in 1999